Live from the Gaiety is a live album by The Dubliners. It was recorded during the Irish leg of their tour celebrating forty years on the road. The double album was recorded at the Gaiety Theatre in Dublin in June 2002.  All surviving members took part. A companion double DVD of the concert in its entirety was also released.

CD listing

DVD listing

Disc 1
 "Fairmoye Lasses & Sporting Paddy" (Traditional)
Instrumental, featuring John Sheahan on violin
 "Foggy Dew" (Traditional)
Lead vocal by Paddy Reilly
 "Rare Old Times" (Pete St. John)
Lead vocal by Paddy Reilly
 "The Banks Of The Roses" (Traditional)
Lead vocal by Seán Cannon
 "Black Velvet Band" (Traditional)
Lead vocal by Seán Cannon
 "Showman's Fancy/Wonder Hornpipe/Swallow's Tail" (Traditional)
Instrumental, featuring John Sheahan on tin whistle and Barney McKenna on tenor banjo
 "Carrickfergus" (Traditional)
Lead vocal by Jim McCann
 "Lord of the Dance" (Sydney Carter)
Lead vocal by Jim McCannLord of The Dance
 "McAlpine's Fusiliers" (Domnic Behan)
Lead vocal by Ronnie Drew
 "Raglan Road" (Patrick Kavanagh)
Lead vocal by Ronnie Drew
 "The Old House/Maid behind the Bar/Boyne Hunt/Shaskeen/High Reel" (Traditional)
Instrumental, featuring Barney McKenna on tenor banjo
 "Seven Drunken Nights" (Traditional)
Lead vocal by Ronnie Drew

Disc 2
 Don't Give Up 'Til It's Over" (Johnny Duhan)
Lead vocal by Ronnie Drew
 The Town I Loved So Well" (Phil Coulter)
Lead vocal by Paddy Reilly
 "South Australia" (Traditional)
Lead vocal by Barney McKenna
 "Whiskey In The Jar" (Traditional)
Lead vocal by Seán Cannon
 "Grace" (Seán & Frank O'Meara)
Lead vocal by Jim McCann
 "Chief O'Neill's/Trumpet Hornpipe/Mullingar Races (Traditional)
Instrumental, featuring Barney McKenna and John Sheahan on mandolins
 "Dicey Reilly" (Traditional)
Lead vocal by Ronnie Drew
 "Cill Chais" (Traditional)
Lead vocal by Seán Cannon
 "Roisin The Bow" (Traditional)
Lead vocal by Jim McCann
 "Fields Of Athenry" (St. John)
Lead vocal by Paddy Reilly
 "Marino Casino/Gerry Cronin's Reel/Denis Langton's Reel/The Irish Washerwoman" (Sheahan/Traditional/Trad/Trad)
Instrumental, featuring John Sheahan on violin
 "Dirty Old Town" (Ewan MacColl)
Lead vocal by Paddy Reilly
 "Wild Rover" (Traditional)
Lead vocals by Paddy Reilly (first verse), Ronnie Drew (second verse), Seán Cannon (third verse) and Jim McCann (fourth verse)
 "The Irish Rover" (Joseph Crofts)
Lead vocal by Ronnie Drew
 "Molly Malone" (Traditional)
Lead vocal by Paddy Reilly

Personnel
Eamonn Campbell - acoustic guitar, mandolin, vocals
Seán Cannon - acoustic guitar, vocals
Ronnie Drew - acoustic guitar, vocals
Jim McCann - acoustic guitar, vocals
Barney McKenna - tenor banjo, mandolin, vocals
Paddy Reilly - acoustic guitar, vocals
John Sheahan - fiddle, tin whistle, mandolin, vocals

The Dubliners live albums
2002 live albums